Dugmore is a surname. Notable people with the name include:

 Arthur Radclyffe Dugmore (1870-1955), Irish-born American naturalist and wildlife artist
 Cyril Dugmore (1882–1966), British track and field athlete
 Dan Dugmore (born c. 1949), American steel guitar musician
 Edward Dugmore (1915–1996), American abstract expressionist painter
 Geoff Dugmore (born 1960), Scottish drummer, musical director and producer
 Grant Dugmore (born 1967), South African-Argentine cricketer
 Henry Hare Dugmore (1810–1896), English missionary, writer and translator
 John Dugmore of Swaffham (1793–1871), British draughtsman and grand-tourist